The Botswana Swimming Sport Association is the national governing body for the sport of swimming in Botswana.

References

National members of the African Swimming Confederation
Swimming
Swimming in Botswana
2005 establishments in Botswana
Sports organizations established in 2005